"Christine" is a song by English rock band Siouxsie and the Banshees, written by Siouxsie Sioux and Steven Severin. It was released in 1980 by Polydor as the second single from the then-unreleased third album, Kaleidoscope.

Content, music video and release
"Christine" marked a change in musical direction for the band, with new guitarist John McGeoch. The song begins with a distinctive riff played on an acoustic guitar. The post-chorus instrumentation includes electronic organ. The close of the song utilizes a strong flanging effect. The lyrics were inspired by the book The Three Faces of Eve which related the story of Christine Sizemore, a woman who reportedly had 22 different personalities.

The B-side, "Eve White/Eve Black", continues with the theme. Bassist Steven Severin stated in the liner notes for Downside Up: "Again a companion piece to the A side 'Christine'. Eve White and Eve Black were two of Christine Sizemore's more extraordinary personalities, constantly at war."

The band shot a music video for the song with director Clive Richardson, another music video was filmed on the same set for the song "Red Light". Neither featured McGeoch as he was not an artist signed on Polydor yet.

"Christine" was released as a single by record label Polydor on 30 May 1980. It peaked at number 22 in the UK Singles Chart.

Cover versions
The song was covered by Red Hot Chili Peppers with John Frusciante on guitar at their V2001 Festival performance, and by Simple Minds on the deluxe edition of their Graffiti Soul album in 2009.

Track listing

References

1980 singles
Siouxsie and the Banshees songs
Polydor Records singles
Song recordings produced by Nigel Gray
1980 songs
Songs written by Siouxsie Sioux
Songs written by Steven Severin